is a former Japanese football player.

Club statistics

External links

j-league

1985 births
Living people
Meiji University alumni
Association football people from Tokyo
Japanese footballers
J2 League players
Japan Football League players
Tochigi SC players
Sony Sendai FC players
Association football defenders